Madhya Pradesh Board of Secondary Education (abbreviated MPBSE) is a board of school education in Madhya Pradesh State of India.

The MPBSE is a Madhya Pradesh government body responsible for determining the policy-related, administrative, cognitive, and intellectual direction of the state's higher educational system.
The board regulates and supervises the system of Intermediate education in Madhya Pradesh State. It executes and governs various activities that include devising of courses of study, prescribing syllabus, conducting examinations, granting affiliations to colleges. MPBSE also provides direction, support and leadership for all educational institutions under its jurisdiction. It also runs model schools such as the Model High, TT Nagar.

Establishment

The Madhya Pradesh Legislature, in the sixteenth year of the Republic of India, enacted an Act for the establishment of a Board in order to regulate Secondary Education in Madhya Pradesh and other ancillary matters. In 1965 this autonomous body was established under The Madhya Pradesh Secondary Education Act, 1965.

Activities

 To grant affiliation/recognition to schools.
 To prescribe courses and text books at High school and Intermediate level.
 To conduct High school and Intermediations.
 To provide equivalence to the examinations conducted by other Boards.

Academics

The MPBSE prescribes the syllabus, for students from Standard IX to Standard XII, for schools affiliated with it & exams whose scores are necessary to gain admission in higher study institutes.
 Bengali, Oriya, Punjabi, Kannada, Malayalam, Tamil, Telugu,  Gujarati, Marathi, Sanskrit, Sindhi, Urdu, Arabic, French, Russian or Persian, can be chosen as a language subject in addition to the compulsory English language and Hindi languages.

Examination
It conducts three board examinations: the Middle School Exam for Standard VIII, High School Certificate Examination for standard X and the Higher Secondary (School) Certificate (HSC) Exam for standard XII, which is a school-leaving examination.

See also 

 Central Board of Secondary Education (CBSE), India
 National Institute of Open Schooling (NIOS), India
 Indian Certificate of Secondary Education (ICSE), India
 Indian School Certificate (ISC),India
 Council for the Indian School Certificate Examinations (CISCE), India
 Secondary School Leaving Certificate (SSLC), India

References
7.   http://mpbse.nic.in/contactus.html

External links
 Board of Secondary Education, Madhya Pradesh 12th Result 2020
 Board of Secondary Education, Madhya Pradesh

Madhya
Education in Madhya Pradesh
State agencies of Madhya Pradesh
1965 establishments in Madhya Pradesh
Government agencies established in 1965